This is a list of operational, offshore wind farms in Sweden (within the national maritime boundaries).

This information is gathered from multiple Internet sources, and commercial sources. 
The name of the wind farm is the name used by the energy company when referring to the farm and is usually related to a shoal or the name of the nearest town on shore. The "wind farm" part is implied and hence removed for clarity.

List of current farms
The list is sorted by capacity, but it can be sorted in any way by clicking the symbol >< at the top in each column.

List of past farms

Wind farm home pages

See also
List of wind farms in Sweden
Wind power in Sweden
List of wind farms
List of offshore wind farms
Lists of offshore wind farms by country
Lists of offshore wind farms by water area
List of offshore wind farms in the Baltic Sea

References

External links
 LORC Offshore Renewables Map - Sweden

Sweden